SF Site is an online science fiction and fantasy magazine edited by Rodger Turner. It is among the oldest of websites dedicated to science fiction and primarily publishes book reviews. It has won the Locus Award and received nominations for the Hugo and World Fantasy Awards. SF Site also provides web hosting services, and was instrumental in the online presence of major magazines such as Analog, Asimov's, F&SF and Interzone.

History

Established in June 1997 by John O'Neill and Rodger Turner, SF Site is an online magazine of science fiction and fantasy, and among the oldest of SF websites. It is based in Ottawa, Canada, but includes contributors from around the world, and had 200,000 unique visitors per month in 2001.  It primarily publishes reviews of science fiction books; it also reviews films, television, and features interviews with authors and fiction excerpts.  Contributors include Steven H Silver, Richard Lupoff, Rick Norwood, Victoria Strauss, Mark London Williams, and Rick Klaw.

Through its web hosting services, SF Site was responsible for bringing four major science fiction magazines Analog, Asimov's, F&SF and Interzone to the Internet. 
It also hosted science fiction and fantasy authors such as Steven Erikson and a fan-run website for Guy Gavriel Kay.  It hosts a science fiction discussion forum and RSS feed.  

In December 2013, SF Site suspended production of regular twice-monthly updates, due to declining advertising revenue.
The magazine's news blog was placed on hiatus in 2018.

Reception
In 2000 editor Gardner Dozois, writing in The Mammoth Book of Best New SF, described SF Site as one of the most important genre-related websites on the internet. Zachary Houle wrote in the Ottawa Citizen in 2001, "Over four short years, [SF Site] has become a big player in broadening the appeal of speculative fiction—the SF referred to in its name" and said, "the site is also highly regarded by the major publishing houses, which generously lift quotes from the site's reviews for book-cover blurbs".

SF Site won the 2002 Locus Award for Best Website, and was a nominee for the 2002 Hugo Award in the same category. It was also nominated for the World Fantasy Award for Non-Professional Work in 2004 and 2006.

References

External links

Magazines established in 1996
Science fiction-related magazines
Science fiction webzines
Online magazines published in Canada